Frédéric Peiremans (born 3 September 1973) is a Belgian former footballer who played for Anderlecht, Charleroi, FC Twente, Real Sociedad and SD Eibar, as well as the Belgium national team.

References

External links
 Player profile at PlayerHistory.com
 
 

1973 births
Living people
Belgian footballers
Belgium international footballers
R.S.C. Anderlecht players
R. Charleroi S.C. players
FC Twente players
Real Sociedad footballers
SD Eibar footballers
Expatriate footballers in the Netherlands
Expatriate footballers in Spain
Belgian expatriate footballers
Belgian expatriate sportspeople in Spain
Association football midfielders
People from Nivelles
Footballers from Walloon Brabant